Lyle Gatley (born 22 September 1945) is a Canadian rower. He competed in the men's coxless pair event at the 1968 Summer Olympics.

References

1945 births
Living people
Canadian male rowers
Olympic rowers of Canada
Rowers at the 1968 Summer Olympics
Rowers from Vancouver